Hilja Pärssinen (13 July 1876, in Halsua – 23 September 1935, in née Lindgren) was a Finnish schoolteacher, poet, journalist and politician. She served as a Member of the Parliament of Finland from 1907 to 1918 and again from 1929 until her death in 1935. During the Finnish Civil War in 1918, she was a member of the Finnish People's Delegation. After the defeat of the Red side, she fled at first to Soviet Russia and then to Estonia, from where she was extradited back to Finland in 1919 to receive a 12-year prison sentence for her role on the losing side of the Civil War. She was pardoned in 1923 and returned to politics.

References

1876 births
1935 deaths
People from Halsua
People from Vaasa Province (Grand Duchy of Finland)
Social Democratic Party of Finland politicians
Finnish People's Delegation members
Members of the Parliament of Finland (1907–08)
Members of the Parliament of Finland (1908–09)
Members of the Parliament of Finland (1909–10)
Members of the Parliament of Finland (1910–11)
Members of the Parliament of Finland (1911–13)
Members of the Parliament of Finland (1913–16)
Members of the Parliament of Finland (1916–17)
Members of the Parliament of Finland (1917–19)
Members of the Parliament of Finland (1929–30)
Members of the Parliament of Finland (1930–33)
Members of the Parliament of Finland (1933–36)
Women members of the Parliament of Finland
Prisoners and detainees of Finland
Finnish expatriates in Estonia
Finnish expatriates in Russia
Finnish refugees
People extradited to Finland
Prisoners and detainees of Estonia
Refugees in Russia
20th-century Finnish women politicians